The 1990–91 AHL season was the 55th season of the American Hockey League. Fifteen teams played 80 games each in the schedule. The Rochester Americans finished first overall in the regular season. The Springfield Indians won their seventh and final Calder Cup championship.

Team changes
 The Binghamton Whalers became the Binghamton Rangers.
 The Sherbrooke Canadiens moved to Fredericton, New Brunswick, becoming the Fredericton Canadiens.
 The Capital District Islanders joined the AHL as an expansion team, based in Troy, New York, playing in the South Division.

Final standings
Note: GP = Games played; W = Wins; L = Losses; T = Ties; GF = Goals for; GA = Goals against; Pts = Points;

Scoring leaders

Note: GP = Games played; G = Goals; A = Assists; Pts = Points; PIM = Penalty minutes

 complete list

Calder Cup playoffs

Note: Preliminary Round was played as a two-game, total-goals series

Trophy and award winners
Team awards

Individual awards

Other awards

See also
List of AHL seasons

References
AHL official site
AHL Hall of Fame

  
American Hockey League seasons
2
2